Agus Adi Prayoko (born 4 May 1989) is an Indonesian artistic gymnast. He won the bronze medal in the men's vault event at the 2018 Asian Games held in Jakarta, Indonesia.

In 2015, he competed in the men's vault event at the Southeast Asian Games held in Singapore.

In 2017, he won the silver medal in the men's vault event at the Southeast Asian Games held in Kuala Lumpur, Malaysia. Two years later, in 2019, he won the gold medal in the men's vault event at the 2019 Southeast Asian Games.

References

External links 
 

Living people
1989 births
Place of birth missing (living people)
Indonesian male artistic gymnasts
Gymnasts at the 2018 Asian Games
Medalists at the 2018 Asian Games
Asian Games medalists in gymnastics
Asian Games bronze medalists for Indonesia
Southeast Asian Games medalists in gymnastics
Southeast Asian Games gold medalists for Indonesia
Southeast Asian Games silver medalists for Indonesia
Southeast Asian Games bronze medalists for Indonesia
Competitors at the 2011 Southeast Asian Games
Competitors at the 2015 Southeast Asian Games
Competitors at the 2017 Southeast Asian Games
Competitors at the 2019 Southeast Asian Games
21st-century Indonesian people